Wolf Creek is in the Yukon Territory, Canada.

Research station
A research station at Wolf Creek Research Basin has been providing continuous data since 1992 for hydrological data. There are three meteorological stations, a  groundwater monitoring well since 2003, as well as specialized instrumentation running continuously for specific projects.

It is an important location for the study of snow and climate in the region.

References

Research stations
Buildings and structures in Yukon